Ochromima marginicollis is a species of beetle in the family Cerambycidae. It was described by Charles Joseph Gahan in 1889. It is known from Brazil and French Guiana.

References

Hemilophini
Beetles described in 1889